Standish-Sterling Community Schools is a public school district in the U.S. state of Michigan serving preschool through 12th grade. The district draws approximately 1,800 students from Arenac County and the cities of Standish and Omer, and the areas of Alger, Pinconning, Bentley, and Sterling. The district includes Sterling Elementary School (Preschool-K), Standish-Sterling Central Elementary School (1-6), and Standish-Sterling Central High School (7-12).

History
Sterling Elementary School in Sterling previously taught K-6 until 2017 when it converted to Preschool-K only.  Standish-Sterling Central Elementary School was the previous Standish-Sterling Central High School from 1959 to 2001 and Standish-Sterling Middle School from 2001-2016.  Standish-Sterling High School, about 1/4 mile to the northeast of SSC Elementary, opened in 2001.  In 2017, Standish Elementary School in Standish closed due to restructuring.

In 2017, Arenac-Eastern School began sending students to Standish-Sterling due to declining enrollment. On March 10, 2020, the vote passed by the three districts for Arenac-Eastern to be dissolved effective in June 2020 and split between Standish-Sterling Community Schools and Au Gres-Sims School District along M-65.

The mascot of the schools is the panther. The school colors are blue (navy blue rather than actual blue) and white with a tertiary color being gold.

The 1958-59 school year launched the consolidation of Sterling (known as the "Hawks") and Standish (known as the "Golden Arrows") school districts into the present day Standish-Sterling school district.

Sports 
The Standish-Sterling school district has a variety of sports to offer. Some include, football, boys and girls basketball, swim, boys and girls cross-country, boys and girls soccer, baseball, softball, cheer, and dance team.

External links
Standish-Sterling Community Schools
Standish-Sterling Panthers historical high school football scores
Sterling Hawks historical high school football scores
Standish Golden Arrows historical high school football scores

References

School districts in Michigan
Education in Arenac County, Michigan
1958 establishments in Michigan
School districts established in 1958